Rolf Sørensen (born 20 April 1965) is a former Danish professional road bicycle racer.  He is currently working as a cycling commentator and agent. Born in Helsinge in Denmark, Sørensen moved to Italy at the age of 17, where he has lived since. He was a client of Francesco Conconi and Luigi Cecchini. He goes under the name Il Biondo due to his blonde hair. He is married to Susanne.

Accomplishments
Sørensen won such classic one-day races as the Tour of Flanders, Liège–Bastogne–Liège, Paris–Brussels, Paris–Tours and Milano–Torino, as well as slightly smaller races like the Coppa Bernocchi (twice), and the Rund um den Henninger Turm or Grand Prix Frankfurt.  He has led the UCI Road World Cup on several occasions, finishing third in 1989 and 1991 and second in 1997 after a broken foot kept him from scoring points in the last two World Cup races of the season.

Sørensen also won individual stages in the 1994 and 1996 Tour de France, and wore the yellow jersey as the leader of the race after the team time trial in 1991, won by his Italian team Ariostea. He kept it until he broke his collar bone in a fall four days later.

Rolf Sørensen participated in the Tour seven times, the last in 2001. He has also won a number of stages in other stage races, among them stage 9 of the 1995 Giro d'Italia, three stages in the Tour of the Basque Country, six stages in Tirreno–Adriatico, two in the Tour de Suisse, and two in the Tour de Romandie.

Sørensen also claimed the silver medal at the 1996 Olympics.

Doping
For many years Sørensen denied that he used performance-enhancing drugs, but more than a decade after the end of his career as a professional cyclist he admitted using EPO, and to some extent, Cortisone.  He broke the news to Danish TV2 on March 18, 2013.

Career achievements

Major results

1986
 1st  Points classification Danmark Rundt
 9th Milan–San Remo
1987
 1st  Overall Tirreno–Adriatico
 1st Grand Prix Pino Cerami
 2nd Overall Danmark Rundt
1st  Young rider classification
 3rd Overall Settimana Internazionale di Coppi e Bartali
1988
 1st Gran Premio Città di Camaiore
 2nd Overall Danmark Rundt
1st  Points classification
1st  Young rider classification
 2nd Züri–Metzgete
 2nd Rund um den Henninger Turm
 3rd Overall Tirreno–Adriatico
 3rd Giro dell'Emilia
 3rd Grand Prix Pino Cerami
 8th Liège–Bastogne–Liège
1989
 1st Stage 3 (TTT) Giro d'Italia
 1st Coppa Bernocchi
 1st Giro dell'Etna
 2nd Coppa Ugo Agostoni
 3rd Gent–Wevelgem
 4th Tour of Flanders
 4th Züri–Metzgete
 9th Rund um den Henninger Turm
1990
 1st  Overall Settimana Internazionale di Coppi e Bartali
 1st Paris–Tours
 1st Trofeo Laigueglia
 2nd Coppa Bernocchi
 6th Züri–Metzgete
 6th Tre Valli Varesine
 7th Milano–Torino
1991
 Tour de France
1st Stage 2 (TTT)
Held  after Stage 2-5
 1st Stage 9 Tour de Suisse
 2nd Milan–San Remo
 3rd UCI Road World Cup
 3rd Tour of Flanders
 3rd Liège–Bastogne–Liège
 5th Giro di Lombardia
1992
 1st  Overall Tirreno–Adriatico
1st Stage 3
 1st Paris–Brussels
 5th Giro di Lombardia
 7th Rund um den Henninger Turm
 9th Milano–Torino
 10th Milan–San Remo
1993
 1st Liège–Bastogne–Liège
 1st Milano–Torino
 1st Rund um den Henninger Turm
 1st Coppa Bernocchi
 1st Stage 7 Tirreno–Adriatico
 1st Stage 9 Tour de Suisse
 1st Stage 3a Three Days of De Panne
 Tour de Romandie
1st Stage 1, 2 & 6
 2nd Overall Tour of the Basque Country
 5th Milan–San Remo
 6th La Flèche Wallonne
1994
 Tour de France
1st Stages 3 (TTT) & 14
 1st Paris–Brussels
 1st Trofeo Laigueglia
 6th Overall Tirreno–Adriatico
 6th Road race, UCI Road World Championships
1995
 1st Stage 9 Giro d'Italia
 2nd Overall Three Days of De Panne
 2nd Milano–Torino
 3rd Paris–Brussels
 4th Giro di Lombardia
 5th Giro dell'Emilia
 8th Liège–Bastogne–Liège
 9th Road race, UCI Road World Championships
1996
 1st Stage 13 Tour de France
 1st  Overall Ronde van Nederland
1st Stage 4
 1st Kuurne–Brussels–Kuurne
 1st Stage 7 Tirreno–Adriatico
 2nd Overall Danmark Rundt
 2nd  Road race, Olympic Games
 3rd Rund um den Henninger Turm
 9th Liège–Bastogne–Liège
 9th Paris–Brussels
 9th De Brabantse Pijl
1997
 1st Tour of Flanders
 1st Prologue Tirreno–Adriatico
 1st Stage 3b Three Days of De Panne
 2nd UCI Road World Cup
 3rd Züri–Metzgete
 4th Kuurne–Brussels–Kuurne
 6th Paris–Roubaix
 8th Milan–San Remo
 10th Amstel Gold Race
1998
 1st  Overall Ronde van Nederland
 2nd Overall Danmark Rundt
 4th Overall Tirreno–Adriatico
1st Stage 5
 4th Overall Three Days of De Panne
 6th Paris–Roubaix
1999
 2nd Overall Danmark Rundt
1st Stage 1
 4th Overall Three Days of De Panne
 7th Kuurne–Brussels–Kuurne
2000
 1st  Overall Danmark Rundt
 3rd De Brabantse Pijl
 8th Milan–San Remo
 8th Paris–Tours
2001
 4th Tour of Flanders
 10th Milan–San Remo
 10th Paris–Roubaix
2002
 6th Tour of Flanders

Monuments results timeline

References

External links
 DCU profile
 Trap-Friis profile

1965 births
Living people
Danish male cyclists
Danish Tour de France stage winners
Cyclists at the 1996 Summer Olympics
Olympic cyclists of Denmark
Olympic silver medalists for Denmark
Danish Giro d'Italia stage winners
Cycling announcers
Olympic medalists in cycling
Danmark Rundt winners
Danish sportspeople in doping cases
Doping cases in cycling
People from Gribskov Municipality
Tour de Suisse stage winners
Medalists at the 1996 Summer Olympics
Sportspeople from the Capital Region of Denmark